The canton of Châtenois-les-Forges is an administrative division of the Territoire de Belfort department, northeastern France. Its borders were modified at the French canton reorganisation which came into effect in March 2015. Its seat is in Châtenois-les-Forges.

It consists of the following communes:

Andelnans 
Argiésans
Banvillars
Bermont
Botans
Bourogne
Buc
Charmois
Châtenois-les-Forges
Chèvremont
Dorans
Meroux-Moval
Sevenans
Trévenans
Urcerey
Vézelois

References

Cantons of the Territoire de Belfort